The 1921 Chicago American Giants baseball team represented the Chicago American Giants in the Negro National League (NNL) during the 1920 baseball season. The team compiled a 55–29–4 record and won the NNL pennant. Rube Foster was the team's owner and manager. The team played its home games at Schorling Park in Chicago. 

The team's leading batters were:
 Center fielder Cristóbal Torriente - .352 batting average, .593 slugging percentage, 12 home runs, 74 RBIs, 19 stolen bases in 84 games (Torriente was later inducted into the Baseball Hall of Fame.)
 Left fielder Jimmy Lyons - .301 batting average, .420 slugging percentage in 81 games
 Second baseman Bingo DeMoss - .266 batting average, .324 slugging percentage in 84 games

The team's leading pitchers were Dave Brown (17–2, 2.50 ERA, 126 strikeouts) and Tom Williams (14–8, 2.82 ERA).

References

1921 in sports in Illinois
Negro league baseball seasons